Star Wars Forces of Destiny is a 2D animated web series by Lucasfilm Animation released through Lucasfilm's YouTube channel. Set across multiple eras of the Star Wars franchise, it is a collection of two- to three-minute shorts centering on female characters featured in previous Star Wars installments. The series premiered on July 3, 2017, beginning the daily release of a set of eight episodes; these episodes subsequently began broadcasting on Disney Channel on July 9. An additional eight episodes were released in Fall 2017, and the second season of eight episodes was released in 2018.

First announced and presented in April 2017 during  Star Wars Celebration Orlando, Forces of Destiny is part of a franchise expansion initiative by Disney Consumer Products and Interactive Media and includes a companion toy line by Hasbro and a series of youth-aimed books. The series is the first 2D animated series produced by Lucasfilm since the 2003 Star Wars: Clone Wars series and the first 2D project by Lucasfilm Animation, which formed after the development of Clone Wars.

Premise
An animated micro-series starring female characters such as Princess Leia Organa, Sabine Wren, Jyn Erso, Rose Tico, Ahsoka Tano, Padmé Amidala, Hera Syndulla, and Rey.

Cast and characters

 Ashley Eckstein as Ahsoka Tano
 Olivia Hack as Qi'ra
 Felicity Jones (season 1) and Helen Sadler (season 2) as Jyn Erso
 Vanessa Marshall as Hera Syndulla
 Lupita Nyong'o as Maz Kanata
 Daisy Ridley as Rey
 Tiya Sircar as Sabine Wren
 Catherine Taber as Padmé Amidala
 Gina Torres as Ketsu Onyo
 Kelly Marie Tran as Rose Tico
 Shelby Young as Princess Leia Organa

Matt Lanter and Jim Cummings reprised the roles of Jedi Knight Anakin Skywalker and space pirate Hondo Ohnaka from The Clone Wars and Rebels. Tom Kane returned as Jedi Master Yoda from The Clone Wars, while Taylor Gray and Ritesh Rajan reprised the roles of Jedi Padawan Ezra Bridger and Mandalorian warrior Tristan Wren from Rebels. 

Film actor John Boyega returned as defected First Order stormtrooper Finn, with Mark Hamill returning as Luke Skywalker and Anthony Daniels once again providing the voice of protocol droid . 

Other characters to appear include smugglers Han Solo and Chewbacca, the ewok Wicket W. Warrick, and droids R2-D2, BB-8 and Chopper.

Production
Forces of Destiny was announced on April 12, 2017, and a special preview of the series presented at Star Wars Celebration Orlando on April 14. The series is the first 2D animated series produced by Lucasfilm since the 2003 Clone Wars series and the first 2D animation project created by Lucasfilm Animation; previous 2D animated series such as Ewoks, Droids, and early installments of Clone Wars were created before the formation of the studio. The series is part of Disney Consumer Products and Interactive Media's franchise expansion initiative.

Forces of Destiny was created as a series of web shorts because it was felt to better appeal to children's watching patterns: "The way that kids are consuming content today, they're still watching linear television, but increasingly they're consuming content digitally, online. We've created a story format here that reflects that. It's a combination of digital and linear." Each episode is written by Jennifer Muro and directed by Brad Rau.

The series’ original score, opening theme, and closing theme was composed by Ryan Shore.

Episodes

Series overview

Season 1 (2017)

Season 2 (2018)
A second season of fifteen additional episodes was announced in September 2017. The episodes were released on March 19, 2018 online and aired on Disney Channel on March 25, 2018.

Distribution
Forces of Destiny premiered on July 3, 2017, through Disney's YouTube channel, beginning the daily release of a set of eight episodes. It was initially announced that this release would culminate in the broadcast premiere of the eight episode set on Disney Channel on July 9 as a thirty-minute special, but on July 9, Disney announced via Twitter that only two episodes were going to be broadcast. A second set of eight episodes was released in October 2017. It was subsequently announced that episodes will air in two half-hour specials on Disney Channel on October 1 and 29. The series is available on the Disney+ streaming service, which launched on November 12, 2019.

Books
A series of youth books adapted the episodes. Daring Adventures: Volume 1 adapted shorts about Sabine, Rey, and Padmé, and Daring Adventures: Volume 2 adapted shorts about Jyn, Ahsoka, and Leia. IDW Publishing published Star Wars: Forces of Destiny, a weekly all-ages five-issue comic book miniseries that ran from January to May 2018.

Merchandising
Alongside the initial series announcement, Lucasfilm also announced a related toy line from Hasbro and an apparel line. The toy line features a new class of figures, adventures figures fill the space between action figures and dolls. These 11-inch articulated figures of the six core female characters and smaller paired figures of other characters launched on August 1, 2017 alongside accessories such as lightsabers. Other characters, including Luke Skywalker and Kylo Ren, are intended to be released.

Reception
SyFy Wire calls Forces of Destiny "a great concept in search of a far better execution. ... What could have been a female-centric version of Genndy Tartakovsky's Clone Wars shorts from 2003 is instead a series of disconnected stories tied to a singular visual aesthetic ... As fun as it is to watch these female characters get a bit more screentime, it's still not enough."

Awards

References

External links
 
 
 
 Inside Forces of Destiny and Star Wars Animation on the Star Wars official YouTube Channel
 

Works based on Star Wars
2017 web series debuts
2010s American animated television series
2010s American anthology television series
2010s American science fiction television series
American animated web series
American children's animated action television series
American children's animated space adventure television series
American children's animated anthology television series
American children's animated science fiction television series
YouTube original programming
Films scored by Ryan Shore
Television series by Lucasfilm